Vraca may refer to:

Vraca, Vratza or Vratsa, a city in northwestern Bulgaria.
Big Vraca, a mountain in Kosovo and the Republic of Macedonia, part of the Šar Mountains.
Small Vraca, a peak in Kosovo and the Republic of Macedonia, part of the Šar Mountains.
Vraca Memorial Park, a park dedicated to the World War II victims in Sarajevo.